The 1964 Notre Dame Fighting Irish football team represented the University of Notre Dame during the 1964 NCAA University Division football season. John Huarte was the sixth Notre Dame player to win the Heisman Trophy. They were crowned national champions by the National football Foundation at the end of the season (however it is not claimed by the university).

Schedule

Source:

Personnel

Game summaries

Wisconsin

In Ara Parseghian's coaching debut for Notre Dame, the players carried Parseghian off the field while the Irish fans in attendance chanted "We're number one" following the victory.

Purdue

Air Force

UCLA

Stanford

Navy

Pittsburgh

Michigan State

Iowa

Southern Cal

Awards and honors
John Huarte, Heisman Trophy

References

Notre Dame
Notre Dame Fighting Irish football seasons
Notre Dame Fighting Irish football